Annie M. Sprinkle (born Ellen F. Steinberg on July 23, 1954) is an American certified sexologist, performance artist, former sex worker, and advocate for sex work and health care. Sprinkle has worked as a prostitute, sex educator, feminist stripper, pornographic film actress, and sex film producer and director. In 1996, she became the first porn star to get a doctoral degree, earning a PhD in human sexuality from the Institute for Advanced Study of Human Sexuality in San Francisco. Identifying as ecosexual, Sprinkle is best known for her self-help style of pornography, teaching individuals about pleasure, and for her conventional pornographic film Deep Inside Annie Sprinkle (1981). Through the production of content, Sprinkle has contributed to feminist pornography and the larger social movement of feminism; she is also known for contributing to the rise of the post-porn movement and lesbian pornography. Sprinkle, a member of the LGBTQ+ community, married her long-time partner Beth Stephens in Canada on January 14, 2007.

Life and career 
Sprinkle was born Ellen F. Steinberg on July 23, 1954, in Philadelphia, Pennsylvania, to a Russian-Jewish mother and a Polish-Jewish father. Her family moved to Los Angeles, California when she was five years old, and she lived in Panama from age thirteen to seventeen. At eighteen, she began working at the ticket booth at the Plaza Cinema in Tucson, Arizona, when Deep Throat (1972) was playing. The film was busted, and when Steinberg had to appear in court as a witness, she met and fell in love with Deep Throat's director, Gerard Damiano, and became his mistress. She followed him to New York City, where she lived for twenty-two years.

Not long after becoming Damiano's mistress, Steinberg began working in porn herself and, at that time, started calling herself "Annie." As her career continued, she says that one night, "as if from the goddess herself," the name "Annie Sprinkle" came to her. She later changed her name legally to Annie Sprinkle. Her first porn movie was Teenage Deviate released in 1975. Perhaps her best known mainstream porn featured role was in Deep Inside Annie Sprinkle (co-directed by Sprinkle and sexploitation veteran Joseph W. Sarno) which was the No. 2 grossing porn film of 1981.

In 1991, Sprinkle created the Sluts and Goddesses workshop, which became the basis for her 1992 production The Sluts and Goddesses Video Workshop – Or How To Be A Sex Goddess in 101 Easy Steps. The film was co-produced and co-directed with videographer Maria Beatty, and it featured music by composer Pauline Oliveros. Sprinkle pioneered new genres of sexually explicit film and video such as edu-porn, gonzo, post porn, xxx docudrama, art porn, and feminist erotica. Sprinkle has also presented many sex workshops with fellow sex facilitator Barbara Carrellas, with whom she presented the stage production Metamorphosex.

Sprinkle has appeared in almost 200 films, including hard- and softcore pornography, B movies, loops, and numerous documentaries. She starred in Nick Zedd's experimental films War Is Menstrual Envy (1992), Ecstasy in Entropy (1999), and Electra Elf: The Beginning (2005). She also appeared in various television shows including four HBO Real Sex programs. She has also produced, directed, and starred in several of her own films, such as Annie Sprinkle's Herstory of Porn, Annie Sprinkle's Amazing World of Orgasm, and Linda/Les & Annie—The First Female to Male Transsexual Love Story. Her work in adult films earned her a spot on the Adult Star Path of Fame in Edison, New Jersey, and she was inducted to both the AVN Hall of Fame and the XRCO Hall of Fame in 1999. For three decades, she has presented her work as a visiting artist at many major universities and colleges in the US and Europe.

Annie Sprinkle is known as the "prostitute and porn star turned sex educator and artist." Her best known theater and performance art piece is her Public Cervix Announcement, in which she invites the audience to "celebrate the female body" by viewing her cervix with a speculum and flashlight. She also performed The Legend of the Ancient Sacred Prostitute, in which she did a "sex magic" masturbation ritual on stage. She has toured one-woman shows internationally for 17 years, some of which were titled Post Porn Modernist, Annie Sprinkle's Herstory of Porn,  and Hardcore from the Heart. She then performed two-woman shows with Beth Stephens titled Exposed; Experiments in Love, Sex, Death and Art, Dirty Sex Ecology, Earthly: An Ecosex Bootcamp, and Ecosex Walking Tour.

Her work and publications, spanning over four decades, are studied in courses at numerous universities, in theater history, women's studies, performance studies, GLBTQ studies and film studies courses. Through The New School of Erotic Touch, she has released several video classes, including Female Genital Massage and Amazing World of Orgasm. Currently her lecture presentation is called "My Life and Work as a Feminist Porn Activist, Radical Sex Educator, and Ecosexual". She has also presented dozens of "Free Sidewalk Sex Clinics", offering free sex education to the public in public space.

Sprinkle's work has always been about sexuality, with a political, spiritual and artistic bent. In December 2005, she committed to doing seven years of art projects about love with her art collaborator and eventual wife, Beth Stephens. They called this their Love Art Laboratory. Part of their project was to do an experimental art wedding each year, and each year had a different theme and color. The seven-year structure was adapted to their project by invitation of artist Linda M. Montano. Sprinkle and Stephens have done twenty-one art weddings, eighteen with ecosexual themes. They married the Earth, Sky, Sea, Moon, Appalachian Mountains, the Sun, and other non-human entities in nine different countries including at Montreal's Edgy Women Festival in 2011.

She was featured in Maya Gallus's 1997 documentary film Erotica: A Journey Into Female Sexuality.

Sprinkle and her partner Beth Stephens became pioneers of ecosexuality, a kind of earth-loving sexual identity, which states, "The Earth is our lover". Their Ecosex Manifesto proclaims that anyone can identify as an ecosexual along with being "GLBTQI, heterosexual, asexual, and/or Other."

Sprinkle identifies as a sex-positive feminist, and much of her activist and sex education work reflects this philosophy. In 2009, she appeared in the French documentary film Mutantes: Punk, Porn, Feminism, speaking about the beginnings of the movement as well as her own contributions to it.

In 2017, Sprinkle and Stephens were official artists in Documenta 14. They presented performances and visual art, lectured, and previewed their new film documentary, Water Makes Us Wet: An Ecosexual Adventure.

Feminism 

Sprinkle has contributed to feminism and specifically to feminist pornography by redefining expectations of sexuality. She has defied the ideas of some feminists who refer to themselves as WAPs (women against pornography), who do not believe that the creation of feminist porn is possible. Women against porn believe that porn is a means of hyper sexualization of women, that it is inherently harmful, promotes violence, and objectifies women. However, Sprinkle and other feminists in favor of pornography argue that women have an inherent right to contribute to the production of erotic content and that censorship or restrictions on pornography will not cease its production. As a porn actress, Sprinkle refused to play any submissive roles; instead she displayed more aggression and dominance. She also drew greater attention to the female orgasm. Through her performance artistry, pornographic content and live shows, Sprinkle challenged the censorship of female genitals and presented a reimagination of what and who can be considered sexual.

Due to their creation of the ecosexual identity, Sprinkle and Beth Stephens are also important contributors to environmental activism and sexuality. Ecosexuality involves seeing nature as a lover; this implies that a relationship with the Earth is two-sided, and it therefore holds humans accountable for taking care of the planet. This challenges heteronormative ideals and redefines ideas of love, sexuality and gender. Ecosexuality also contributes to ecofeminism, which highlights how women and nature are treated similarly in a patriarchal society.

After receiving her breast cancer diagnosis, Sprinkle made a collage of her breast tissue scans in order to provoke questions about whether a body that has been subject to surgical procedures and illness can be a sexual one. Sprinkle continued to engage in this medical commentary by juxtaposing medical scans with erotic images and using an electrocardiogram to record the waves of an orgasm. In her performance Public Cervix Announcement, Sprinkle inserted a speculum into her vaginal canal to display her cervix to the audience. The previous acted as satirical-commentary on the private and invasive nature of gynecological procedures. Sprinkle's use of the erotic and explicit imagery can be said to be feminist as it presents the vulva and internal female anatomy as worthy of being the subject of art and encourages individuals to explore their sexuality. The celebration of erotic imagery that is seen in Sprinkle's work can be compared to other feminist artists or art which use genital iconography to invoke questions about sexuality and anatomy such as Frida Kahlo, Georgia O'Keeffe and The Dinner Party by Judy Chicago.

Post-porn movement 
The post-porn movement is a counterculture body of scholarship and ideals that were developed within Europe and the USA. Within the post-porn movement there is a critical lens applied to corporations producing pornography and non-corporate pornographic content is instead valued. The post-porn movement also values the production of pornography which centres queer and gender diverse folks as well as questions the racialization and reliance on stereotypes found in the pornography industry. Sprinkle has contributed to the post-porn movement explicitly in her now retired show Post-Porn Modernist and implicitly through her artistic body of work which engages in critical reflection and parody. Sprinkle has also contributed to this movement by challenging who can be represented in porn and which bodies are sexual ones.

Publications 

 "Contributor" in Webb, S Tattooed Women, Unknown: R. Mutt Press, 1982, .
 With Vera, V. Annie Sprinkle's ABC Study of Sexual Lust and Deviations. Radio Art Publications, 1983, .
 The Kinky World of Annie Sprinkle. Unknown: Hudson Communications, 1985, .
 "Beyond Bisexual", in Bi Any Other Name: Bisexual People Speak Out. Alyson Publications 1991. .
 Annie Sprinkle's Post-Modern Pin-Ups: Pleasure Activist Playing Cards. Gates of Heck, 1995. .
 Love Vibration. Kawade Shobo Shinsha, 1996. .
 
 XXXOOO: Love and Kisses from Annie Sprinkle. Gates of Heck, 1997. .
 Annie Sprinkle [Post-Porn Modernist: My 25 Years as a Multi-Media Whore]. San Francisco: Cleis Press, 1998. .
 With Cody, Gabrielle H. Hardcore from the Heart—The Pleasures, Profits and Politics of Sex in Performance. Continuum International Publishing Group, 2001. .
 Dr. Sprinkle's Spectacular Sex—Make Over Your Love Life with One of the World's Greatest Sex Experts. Tarcher/Penguin, 2005. .
 With Jong, E. Pees on Earth. Brooklyn, New York: powerHouse Books, 2006. .
 "Foreword". In Carrellas, Barbara Urban Tantra: Sacred Sex for the Twenty-First Century. Berkeley, Calif.: Celestial Arts, 2007. .
 "Foreword". In Sundahl, D. Female Ejaculation and the G-Spot. Almeda, Calif.: Hunter House Publishers, 2014. .
 With Yu Dori (Illustrator), Beth Stephens (Contributor) Explorer's Guide to Planet Orgasm: for every body, Greenery Press, 2017, .
 With Stephens, Beth. Documenta 14: Daybook, eds. Laimer, Quinn, Adam Symczyk. Prestel Press, Munich, 2017. pp. 19–20.

Filmography

See also 
International Day to End Violence Against Sex Workers
Mineshaft (gay club)
Same-sex marriage in Canada
Sex-positive feminism

References

Further reading

External links 

Annie Sprinkle official biography page

AnnieSprinkleMovies.com – Experimental and Vintage

1954 births
Living people
Artists from Philadelphia
American female erotic dancers
American erotic dancers
American pornographic film actresses
American pornographic film producers
American prostitutes
American people of Polish-Jewish descent
American people of Russian-Jewish descent
American performance artists
American women performance artists
Censorship in the arts
Feminist artists
Institute for Advanced Study of Human Sexuality alumni
American LGBT artists
American LGBT entertainers
LGBT pornographic film actors
LGBT prostitutes
American LGBT rights activists
Pornographic film actors from Pennsylvania
LGBT feminists
Sex-positive feminists
Sex worker activists in the United States
Third-wave feminism
LGBT Jews
American nurses
American women nurses
American LGBT writers
Franklin Furnace artists
Jewish feminists
Women pornographic film directors
American sex educators
Educators from Pennsylvania
American women educators
Obscenity controversies in literature
Obscenity controversies in art
LGBT-related controversies in art
LGBT-related controversies in literature
21st-century American LGBT people
21st-century American women
Jewish American actresses